Otar Nemsadze (born 18 June 1989) is a Georgian singer. Nemsadze is best known for winning season five of Geostar in 2010. He previously participated in season three of The Voice of Ukraine, finishing second. 

In 2017, he participated in the Georgian selection for Eurovision with the band Limbo. Their song "Dear God" finished 10th with 60 points. He represented Georgia at the Eurovision Song Contest 2019 with the song "Sul tsin iare", having won Georgian Idol for a second time on 3 March, but his song failed to qualify for the Eurovision final. He acted as Georgia's spokesperson in the grand final of the Eurovision Song Contest 2021, announcing the points awarded by the Georgian jury.

Discography
"Dear God" (with Limbo) (2017)
"Sul tsin iare" (2019)

References

External links

1989 births
Living people
People from Gori, Georgia
Idols (TV series) winners
Eurovision Song Contest entrants of 2019
Eurovision Song Contest entrants for Georgia (country)
21st-century male singers from Georgia (country)
The Voice of Ukraine contestants

oc:Oto Nemsadze